Vaccination in Mexico includes the use of vaccines in advancing public health. Mexico has a multi-year program for immunisation of children. The immunisation of children is fully covered by the government of Mexico. 
Mexico has an adverse events committee to monitor the adverse effects of vaccination as well as a standing technical advisory group on immunization.

COVID-19 vaccination

In Mexico, 4% of the individuals received at least one dose of the COVID-19 vaccine as of March 2021. Wealthy Mexicans were reported to travel to the neighbouring United States for receiving their vaccinations. In March, the White House announced that four million of doses of COVID-19 vaccines manufactured in the USA will be sent to Mexico.

In a survey conducted in March 2021, 52% of the Mexicans said that they were willing to get vaccinated against COVID-19, 20% said they were not sure and 28% said they would not get vaccinated.  As of early October, COVID-19 children's vaccination programs began, but only for those with medical conditions, yet when asked in an open survey, parents were highly interested in having their children vaccinated. Nonetheless, parents did express levels of concern involving their children in developing adverse effects from the vaccine.

On 20 April 2021, President López Obrador televised himself receiving the AstraZeneca vaccine.

National vaccination plan
The National vaccination plan against COVID-19 has been planned as below in Mexico: 
 December 2020 - February 2021 : Health workers dealing with COVID 
 February - April 2021 : Other health workers and people 60+ years of age 
 April - May 2021 : People 50–59 years old 
 May - June 2021 : People 40–49 years old 
 June 2021 - March 2022 : People 19–39 years old (children under 18 are exempted from vaccination)

Authorized vaccines
The following vaccines are authorized by the Mexican government for use against COVID-19 (approval date in parentheses):
 BNT162b2 by Pfizer, Inc./BioNTech (December 11, 2020)
 AZD1222 by AstraZeneca/Oxford University (January 4, 2021)
 Sputnik V by the Gamaleya Institute (February 2, 2021)
 Ad5-nCoV by CanSinoBiologics Inc. (February 9, 2021)
 CoronaVac by Sinovac Research and Development Co. (February 9, 2021)
 Covaxin by Bharat Biotech/Indian Council of Medical Research (April 6, 2021)

Routine vaccines
The recommended vaccine schedule for children in Mexico contains vaccinations against sixteen vaccine preventable diseases. Vaccine doses administered in Mexico are usually valid in the United States. The immunization schedule for children in Mexico is as follows:

In addition, Vitamin A is offered to all children of one year of age enrolled in nurseries or children's rooms.

Vaccine coverage
The vaccine coverage of various vaccines in Mexico are as follows, according to the most recent survey conducted by the World Health Organization in 2014:

According to the statistics from WHO, no cases of diphtheria, measles, polio and yellow fever were reported in Mexico in 2019. However, mumps and pertussis cases are on the rise in Mexico, with 8009 and 874 children reportedly having contracted mumps and pertussis respectively in 2019. There was an increase in tetanus cases from a total of 23 in 2018 to 35 in 2019.

References

Healthcare in Mexico
Mexico